Cosme Gómez Tejada de los Reyes (died c.1661) was a writer, poet and dramatist of the Spanish Golden Age.

1661 deaths
Spanish dramatists and playwrights
Spanish male dramatists and playwrights
17th-century Spanish poets
Year of birth unknown
Spanish male poets
University of Salamanca alumni
17th-century male writers